China competed in the 1990 Asian Winter Games which were held in Sapporo, Japan from March 9, 1990 to March 14, 1990.

See also
 China at the Asian Games
 China at the Olympics
 Sports in China

Asian Games
China at the Asian Winter Games
Nations at the 1990 Asian Winter Games